Mehdi Ghoreishi is an Iranian football defender who currently plays for Iranian football club Aluminium Arak F.C. in the Iran pro League.

References

Living people
1990 births
Sportspeople from Tabriz
Tractor S.C. players
Machine Sazi F.C. players
Gostaresh Foulad F.C. players
Association football defenders
Iranian footballers